is a 1933 Japanese silent gangster film directed by Yasujirō Ozu. Written by Tadao Ikeda, the film tells the story of a gangster and his girlfriend finding redemption through the actions of an innocent girl and her not-so-innocent brother.

Plot
Tokiko (Kinuyo Tanaka) is a typist and the girlfriend of a small-time gangster, Joji (Joji Oka). A student, Hiroshi (Kōji Mitsui), joins the gang. When Joji begins to fall for Hiroshi's sister, Kazuko (Sumiko Mizukubo), Tokiko decides to scare her rival away. However, Tokiko takes a liking to Kazuko and decides to reform. Joji throws Tokiko out, but she soon returns and convinces him to give up his life of crime.

Meanwhile, Hiroshi has stolen money from the shop where his sister works. Joji and Tokiko rob Tokiko's boss and give the money to Hiroshi so that he can pay back the money he stole.

Pursued by the police, Tokiko entreats Joji to surrender. When he refuses, she shoots him. Police officers close in as the couple embrace.

Cast

Kinuyo Tanaka as Tokiko
Joji Oka as Joji
Sumiko Mizukubo as Kazuko
Hideo Mitsui as Hiroshi
Yumeko Aizome as Misako
Yoshio Takayama as Senko
Koji Kaga as Misawa
Yasuo Nanjo as Okazaki, the president's son
Chishū Ryū as a policeman

Home media
On 18 March 2013, the British Film Institute released the film on Region 2 DVD as part of The Gangster Films collection, along with Walk Cheerfully (1930), That Night's Wife (1930), and the surviving fragment of A Straightforward Boy (1929).

The Criterion Collection released the film for Region 1 on 21 April 2015, along with Ozu's Walk Cheerfully and That Night's Wife, as part of a DVD boxset through its Eclipse series.

Cinematic release
The film was shown in a number of venues across Scotland in 2014, as part of the Hippodrome Festival of Silent Cinema, with live musical accompaniment by Jane Gardner (piano), Roddy Long (violin) and Hazel Morrison (percussion).  This new score was also composed by Jane Gardner.

References

External links 

1933 films
Gangster films
Films directed by Yasujirō Ozu
Japanese black-and-white films
1933 crime films
Shochiku films
Japanese crime films
Films with screenplays by Tadao Ikeda
Japanese silent films
1930s Japanese-language films